The Goggomobil Dart was a microcar which was developed in Australia by Sydney company Buckle Motors Pty Ltd. and produced from 1959 to 1961.

The Dart was based on the chassis and mechanical components of the German Goggomobil microcar, which was a product of Hans Glas GmbH of Dingolfing, in Bavaria, Germany. The car featured an Australian-designed fibreglass two-seater open sports car body without doors, the whole package weighing in at only . It was powered by a rear-mounted twin-cylinder two-stroke motor available in both 300 cc and 400 cc variants, and had a small luggage compartment built into the nose. The Dart was designed in 1958 and went on sale the following year, with around 700 examples produced up to the time that production ceased in September 1961.

Production specifics 
The Dart came standard with Goggomobil’s 293cc parallel twin (producing 15 hp and 20 ft.lb.), but their 392cc unit (20 hp/24 ft.lb.) soon became available as an option. Top speed was approximately 60 mph (96 km/h) for the 293cc cars, and about 65 mph (104 km/h) for those equipped with the 392cc engine. There may only by 50 of them left currently. Dimensions were 3.0m long and 1.3m wide

Popular culture
The Goggomobil Dart is mentioned in the 1990s Yellow Pages ad in which Tommy Dysart says the famous line "G, O, G, G, O... No! No! Not the dart!"

Dysart would play off the fame of this role in future ads for Shannons, in which he plays a character who is especially interested in finding the best car insurance for his treasured Goggomobil Dart. 

A documentary which was released on 8 September 2019 titled D'art is about an artist who paints paper planes (paper darts) on the Goggomobil Dart as the canvas. The movie was received with positive reviews. In 2020 D'art was selected for the 'Melbourne Documentary Film Festival'

See also
List of microcars by country of origin: A

References

External links

Article reproduced from Modern Motor 1959 about the prototype Goggomobil Dart
Link to several photographs of a restored 1959 Goggomobil Dart

Microcars
Cars of Australia
Roadsters
Rear-engined vehicles
Cars introduced in 1959